Lake St. Clair is an unincorporated community and census-designated place (CDP) in Franklin County, Missouri, United States. It is in the southeast part of the county, surrounding a lake impounded on a tributary of Hoosier Creek, a south-flowing tributary of the Meramec River.

Lake St. Clair was first listed as a CDP prior to the 2020 census.

Demographics

References 

Census-designated places in Franklin County, Missouri
Census-designated places in Missouri